The list of symphonies in E-flat minor includes:

Philip Greeley Clapp
Symphony No. 9 "The Pioneers" (1931) 
Jordan Grigg 
Symphony No. 12
Nikolai Myaskovsky
Symphony No. 6, Op. 23 (1921-3)
Koichi Kishi
Symphony "Buddha"
Vyacheslav Ovchinnikov
Symphony No. 1 in one movement (1956)
Symphony No. 2 for strings (1973)
Sergei Prokofiev
Symphony No. 6, Op. 111 (1947)
Nikolai Rimsky-Korsakov
Symphony No. 1, Op. 1 (first version of 1861-65)
Joseph Ryelandt
Symphony No. 4, Op. 55 (1913)
Rodion Shchedrin 
Symphony No. 1 (1956-58)
Alexander Tcherepnin
Symphony No. 2, Op. 77 (1947–51)
Ralph Vaughan Williams
Sinfonia antartica (No. 7)
Felix Woyrsch
Symphony No. 3, Op. 70 (1921)

Notes

See also
List of symphonies by key

E flat minor
Symphonies